Zythos is a genus of moths in the family Geometridae. It was described by David Stephen Fletcher in 1979.

Species
Zythos aphrodite (Prout, 1932)
Zythos avellanea (Prout, 1932)
Zythos clypeata Yazaki, 1996
Zythos cupreata (Pagenstecher, 1888)
Zythos erotica (Prout, 1932)
Zythos fastigata (Prout, 1938)
Zythos modesta Yazaki, 1996
Zythos molybdina (Prout, 1938)
Zythos obliterata (Warren, 1897)
Zythos strigata (Warren, 1896)
Zythos turbata (Walker, 1862)

References

Scopulini